Adolfo Bautista Herrera (born 15 May 1979), also known as "Bofo", is a Mexican former professional footballer who played as an attacking midfielder.

Bautista is remembered for his powerful shot, creative ball control, and acrobatic moves, as well as for his extravagant style; especially his colorful hairstyles and unusual squad numbers. He played for a variety of teams, most notably for Guadalajara, as well as the Mexico national team. He also appeared in the 2010 FIFA World Cup representing Mexico.

He is sponsored by Mexican soccer cleat maker Eescord, and oftentimes he threw his cleats into the crowd as part of his goal celebration.

Club career

Beginnings

Adolfo Bautista played in amateur leagues in Dolores Hidalgo, San Diego de la Unión Guanajuato and San Miguel de Allende. Bautista made his debut on March 7, 1998, at the age of 18. He played with Tecos UAG from 1998 to 2002 where he scored 15 goals for the team in those four years. Bautista's first goal in the Mexican Championship was in the Invierno 2000 tournament against Necaxa on September 17, 2000, Tecos lost 3–1.

In late 2002, Bautista was transferred to Monarcas Morelia where he scored 8 goals in 21 games and was one of the team's important players. He made a deadly frontline with Chilean footballer Reinaldo Navia where together they packed over 15 goals for the team. He played for Morelia for two seasons, appearing in the Apertura 2002, Clausura 2003 tournaments where the team came second place and reached the championship finals in two consecutive seasons.
In mid-2003, he was transferred to Pachuca where the expectations did not materialize, as he spent most of his time on the bench. In 19 games, he scored one goal against Chiapas and he struggled to find his form. Despite his poor performances, Pachuca still managed to reach the finals against UANL Tigres of Monterrey. UANL Tigres won the first of two games 1–0 at home and scored another goal in the return game in Pachuca's home stadium. Bautista scored a goal for Pachuca in the 77th minute and gave Pachuca a 3–1 victory over their opponent and took hold of the Championship title.

Guadalajara

After a long transfer period, he was transferred to Guadalajara in 2004. In his first season, he scored nine goals in 19 games and was the team's top scorer.

In 2005, he participated in the Copa Libertadores and scored the last goal of the match with a long-range strike in their notorious 4–0 victory over Boca Juniors. In the second leg at La Bombonera, which ended in a 0–0 draw, Bautista was elbowed by Raúl Alfredo Cascini. After that, Bautista got up and showed four fingers to the Boca crowd, making a reference to Boca's loss in the first leg. Moments later, Martín Palermo ran up to him and headbutted him. Both Palermo and Bautista were red carded for the incident. However, as Bautista was walking off the pitch, a Boca fan attempted to punch him, and Boca coach Jorge José Benítez was caught on tape spitting in his face. The ref attempted to restart the match, but ultimately decided to end it early due to the serious incidents on the pitch, which resulted in Boca's elimination. Chivas went on and lost to Atletico Paranaense 5–2 on aggregate.

During the 2006 Apertura, Bautista scored seven goals to go along with his five assists. He also led Guadalajara to win the final against Deportivo Toluca, after scoring the championship winning goal.  On June 11, 2007, Bautista was put on the Transfer list along with Diego Martínez (who fell out of favor with Vergara), after coach José Manuel de la Torre was not happy with his performance in the loss against rivals América in the 2007 Clausura semi-finals.

Chiapas
'Bofo' was sold to Chiapas on August 4, 2007, and played his first game with them in a 1–1 tie against Atlante. Bautista was given the number 1 (which is mostly used by goalkeepers). On October 31, 2007 'Bofo' scored his second goal with the team against Veracruz. Bofo helped the team get to the playoffs but they were eliminated by Cruz Azul in the quarter finals.

One of Bofo's best seasons was in the 2008 Apertura where he finished as the 3rd top goal scorer with 9 goals, and was the only Mexican in the top 10 goal scorers. He could not play the beginning of the 2008 Clausura because of an injury. His first goal of the tournament came on March 7 in a match against his former team Chivas de Guadalajara. In the 2009 Apertura he played only 8 of 17 matches and scored one goal.

Return to Guadalajara
On December 15, 2009, Bautista rejoined Guadalajara after signing a three-year contract. In 2011, he was placed on the transfer list.

Querétaro
Bautista was loaned to Gallos Blancos, the reason being that he could have more playing time since Guadalajara debuted many new youngsters from their youth squad. He scored his first goal in a 3–0 win against Estudiantes Tecos. Bautista left the club after the season.

Atletico San Luis
Bautista joined newly founded club Atletico San Luis during the summer of 2013. In his short stay at the club Bautista made twelve appearances and did not score.

Chivas USA
On January 14, 2014, Bautista signed with Chivas USA in Major League Soccer.

Coras Tepic
In June 2014 Bautista signed with Deportivo Tepic F.C.

Chicago Mustangs
On December 4, 2015, Bautista signed with the professional indoor club, Chicago Mustangs. Bautista left the club in 2016 after Chicago Mustangs failed to pay his wages.

In June 2017, Bautista announced his official retirement from football. In his press conference he confirmed he was having a match of farewell on July 1, 2017, in the Estadio Jalisco, the former stadium of his boyhood club C.D. Guadalajara. He will team up with former teammates against current and former Liga MX players, and C.D. Guadalajara gave him permission to use the official home kits from the 2017 season.

International career 
Bautista made his debut with the senior national team in 2002. He also was part of the 23-man squad at the 2010 World Cup in South Africa.

Career statistics

International goals

Scores and results list Mexico's goal tally first.

Honours
Pachuca
Mexican Primera División: Apertura 2003

Guadalajara
Mexican Primera División: Apertura 2006

References

External links

 
 
 
 

1979 births
Living people
People from Dolores Hidalgo
Footballers from Guanajuato
Association football forwards
Mexican footballers
Tecos F.C. footballers
Atlético Morelia players
C.F. Pachuca players
C.D. Guadalajara footballers
Chiapas F.C. footballers
Querétaro F.C. footballers
Atlético San Luis footballers
Chivas USA players
Coras de Nayarit F.C. footballers
Liga MX players
Major League Soccer players
Mexico international footballers
2002 CONCACAF Gold Cup players
2004 Copa América players
2007 CONCACAF Gold Cup players
2007 Copa América players
2010 FIFA World Cup players
Mexican expatriate footballers
Expatriate soccer players in the United States
Mexican expatriate sportspeople in the United States